Silverbrook Methodist Church, also known as Silverbrook United Methodist Church, is a historic Methodist church located at Lorton, Fairfax County, Virginia.  It was built between 1906 and 1908, and is a rectangular, one-story, one-room, gable-front, frame structure with a projecting front vestibule topped by a bell tower. It is in the Late Gothic Revival style and measures approximately 24
feet by 40 feet. Also on the property is a contributing church cemetery dated to 1911.

It was listed on the National Register of Historic Places in 2004.

References

Methodist churches in Virginia
Churches on the National Register of Historic Places in Virginia
Carpenter Gothic church buildings in Virginia
Churches completed in 1908
Churches in Fairfax County, Virginia
National Register of Historic Places in Fairfax County, Virginia
1908 establishments in Virginia